The Brooklyn Jewels (also known as the Triangles) were an American basketball team based in Brooklyn, New York that was a member of the Metropolitan Basketball League and the American Basketball League.

After the 1933/34 season the team became the New York Jewels. During the 2nd half of the 1936/37 season, the team was renamed the Brooklyn Jewels. After that season the team became the New Haven Jewels.

The team also played in the 1941-42 season against the Grumman Aircraft Company

Year-by-year

References

Basketball teams in New York City
Sports in Brooklyn